Douglas Martin Lampkin MBE (born 23 March 1976) is an English former professional motorcycle trials and endurocross rider. He competed in the FIM Trial World Championships from 1994 to 2006. Lampkin is notable for being a seven-time motorcycle trials world outdoor champion. He is the second most successful trials rider in history, after Toni Bou with 30 (15 outdoor and 15 indoor). In 2012, Lampkin was named an FIM Legend for his motorcycling achievements.

Career

Lampkin was born in Silsden, West Yorkshire into a family steeped in motorcycle sport. His father, Martin Lampkin, was the first FIM Trial World Championship winner in 1975, and his Uncle, Arthur Lampkin, was also a regular winner on the British circuit in the 1960s.

He has won five consecutive World Indoor (1997–2001) and seven consecutive World Outdoor Championships (1997–2003). He has also won four World Team Championships (Trial des Nations) in years 1997, 1999, 2002 and 2003, six British Adult Championships, two Spanish Adult Championships and the Scottish Six Days Trial on twelve occasions.

Lampkin now lives on the Isle of Man. In 2001, he was appointed an MBE for services to his sport.

Honours 
 British Trials Champion 1994, 1996, 1997, 1998, 1999, 2000, 2001
 Spanish Trials Champion 2001, 2003
 FIM Trials European Champion 1993
 FIM Trials World Champion 1997, 1998, 1999, 2000, 2001, 2002, 2003
 FIM Trials Indoor World Champion 1997, 1998, 1999, 2000, 2001
 Scottish Six Day Trial Winner 1994, 1995, 1996, 2008, 2009, 2012, 2013, 2014, 2015, 2016, 2017, 2018
 Scott Trial Winner 1994, 2006, 2007, 2013, 2017

References

External links 

Dougie Lampkin, official website

1976 births
Living people
English motorcycle racers
Motorcycle trials riders
People from Silsden
Members of the Order of the British Empire
Sportspeople from Yorkshire